The Newark Black Film Festival (NBFF), held every summer since 1974 at the Newark Museum in Newark, New Jersey, is the longest running Black film festival in the United States. The NBFF focuses on the work and history of African Americans and the African Diaspora. Screenings are typically followed by a Q&A session with the filmmakers and scholars.

The Newark Black Film Festival Paul Robeson Awards began as a biennial competition in 1985.

Festival screenings are held in the Billy Johnson Auditorium at the Newark Museum.

The Festival is free of charge to the public and receives funding in the form of grants from various foundations and corporations.

References

African-American film festivals
African-American festivals
Film festivals in New Jersey
Culture of Newark, New Jersey